The Liga Profesional de Primera División (American Spanish , , local: , First Division), named "Torneo Uruguayo Copa Coca-Cola" for sponsorship reasons, is the highest professional football league in Uruguay and organized by the Uruguayan Football Association (AUF).

The first championship was held in 1900, being an amateur competition until 1932 when the league became professional. From 1900 to the 2014–15 season there have been 111 first division seasons.

In 2011, the Uruguayan Primera División was regarded as the 23rd most difficult football league in the 21st century by the International Federation of Football History & Statistics (IFFHS).

If considered the same club, Peñarol/CURCC is the most successful Uruguayan club with 51 titles. Otherwise, it is Nacional with 49 titles. Of clubs to win titles, only Rampla Juniors did not win multiple titles. Rampla Juniors and Wanderers were the only clubs to not win titles consecutively.

History
The Uruguayan Primera División was held by the first time in 1900. Between 1923 and 1925, under the Uruguayan football schism, a dissident league, the Federación Uruguaya de Football, was established. The body operated in parallel with the official Association (AUF). After an intervention by the Uruguayan government to impose the dissolution of the FUF, in 1926 a Provisional Council ("Concejo Provisorio") organised a championship to unify the two organizations. Peñarol was the winner of the Serie A of the tournament. Nevertheless, neither the AUF nor the FIFA recognised the titles of the championships organized by FUF or CP.

From 1930 to 1975, either Nacional or Peñarol won every title. This streak was finally broken when Defensor won its first title in 1976. Besides Nacional or Peñarol, no other club has won titles consecutively. Both Peñarol (1958 to 1962 and 1993 to 1997) and Nacional (from 1939 to 1943) hold the record title streaks winning five titles consecutively. The longest period of time without neither Peñarol nor Nacional winning the title was from 1987 to 1991, when Defensor, Danubio, Progreso, Bella Vista, and again Defensor won the five tournaments played during that period.

After 1994, the competition was divided in two stages, called the Opening Championship (Torneo Apertura) and Closing Championship (Torneo Clausura), with an end-of-season two-legged final match between the winners of these two tournaments.

Originally, like other South American football leagues, the league was contested according to the calendar year, from austral summer to summer in the Southern Hemisphere. In 2005, the league started to play the "European season", from boreal summer to summer in Northern Hemisphere starting in August, with the aim of preventing clubs from losing many players in the middle of the season. In the first semester of 2005, a special short season was held to decide the qualification to international competition. In the 2005–06 season, the winners of the Apertura and Clausura tournaments played a two (or three) legged play-off; the winner of that playoff played against the best team in the aggregate table to decide the 2005–06 season champion.

In the 2006–07 season, the competition was reduced to 16 clubs. The season of 2008–09 was intended to be the last one to be played in "European season", as the system appeared to be unable to prevent clubs from losing players between the Apertura (opening) tournament and the Clausura (closing). However, the transition did not take place for several years. After a regular 2015–16 season was played, a short 2016 was played in the latter half of the year, with the full calendar year system in place once again beginning with the 2017 season.

Participating teams
A total of 58 teams have participated in the Primera Division since its inception in 1900. Nacional has played the most seasons followed by Peñarol/CURCC.  Peñarol and Nacional are also the only two teams to have never been relegated out of the Primera Division. Of the so-called 'minor' teams the record for most seasons lies with Montevideo Wanderers.

2023 season
All statistics pertain only to the Uruguayan Championships organized by the Uruguayan Football Association (AUF), not including FUF tournaments of 1923, 1924 and the 1926 Consejo Provisorio tournament in seasons counted. The founding dates of clubs are those declared by the clubs themselves involved. The column "stadium" reflects the stadium where the team play their home matches, but does not indicate that the team in question owns the stadium.

Champions

List of champions (1900–present)
All tournaments organized by the Uruguayan Football Association (AUF) except where indicated. No records for topscorers during the period 1900–1931.

Titles by club

Clubs participating in the 2023 Uruguayan Primera División season are denoted in bold type.
Clubs no longer active are denoted in italics.

Half-year tournaments

Apertura and Clausura seasons

Torneo Intermedio

Total Half-year tournaments by club

All-time top scorers
The chart includes championships since 1900 to present days.

See also
 Uruguayan football league system
 Uruguayan championship (FUF)
 Torneo del Consejo Provisorio
 Uruguayan Football Stadiums
 Uruguayan Segunda División

Notes

References

External links

 

 
1
Uru
Sports leagues established in 1900
1900 establishments in Uruguay